Ivan Stefan (in English also John Stephen) (c. 1300/1301–1373 (?)) ruled as emperor (tsar) of Bulgaria for eight months from 1330 to 1331. He was the eldest son of emperor Michael III Shishman and Anna Neda of Serbia, a daughter of King Stefan Uroš II Milutin of Serbia. Ivan Stephen was a descendant of the Terter dynasty, the Asen dynasty and the Shishman dynasty. After his father's ascension to the throne in 1323 Ivan Stefan was associated as co-emperor. When Michael III Shishman divorced Anna Neda to marry Theodora Palaiologina, the daughter of Byzantine emperor Michael IX Palaiologos, in 1324, Ivan Stefan was exiled along with his mother and brother in a monastery. In the summer of 1330 he became emperor of Bulgaria with the help of his uncle Stephen Dečanski. After he was deposed in a coup d'état by the Tarnovo nobility, he fled along with Anna Neda in the domains of his father's brother Belaur in Niš and later to Dubrovnik. He was later expelled from there by Stephen Dušan under the pressure of Ivan Alexander. Ivan Stefan probably died in Naples.

Accession to the throne
During the battle of Velbazhd against the Serbs, emperor Michael III Shishman was wounded and died a few days later in captivity. On 2 August the Bulgarian boyars proposed peace to the Serbian king Stephen Dečanski. Stephen Dečanski met them in the area known as Mraka and accepted the proposal and agreed that Ivan Stephen should become emperor of Bulgaria, thus abandoning the idea of uniting the two countries under the sceptre of his son Stephen Dušan. However, less than a year later, Dečanski was deposed and exiled to the Zvečan Fortress where he died.

After the agreement of Mraka was reached, Anna Neda her sons were informed to go to the Bulgarian capital Tarnovo. Ivan Stephen entered the city and was proclaimed emperor in the second half of August 1330. Although he was in his early 30s, Ivan Stephen ruled together with his mother; the reasons for that are unknown.

Byzantine response
After Ivan Stephen took the throne, the second wife of Michael Shishman Theodora Palaiologina was forced to leave the capital along with her sons and departed to Constantinople, to her brother the Byzantine emperor Andronikos III Palaiologos. After the news on the changes in Tarnovo reached Andronikos III he summoned his council and decided to abandon the war against Serbia and turn the Byzantine army to the weakened Bulgaria. The Byzantine emperor covered the attack on his former ally pointing that he would defend the rights of his sister and her children for the Bulgarian throne.

When his troops were prepared in Macedonia, Andronikos III invaded Bulgarian Thrace in the summer of 1330. The towns of Anchialus (Pomorie), Messembria (Nessebar), Aetos (Aytos), Kteniya, Rusokastro and Diampolis (Yambol) surrendered without fighting and the hostilities ceased.

Dethronement and later life
During his rule Ivan Stephen was supported only by his uncle Belaur, while the rest of the nobility considered him a protégé of Dečanski and remained hostile. As a result of the discontent with the new government at the failures against the Byzantines, in March 1331 the protovestiarios Rascin and the logothete Philip organized a successful coup. The despot of Lovech Ivan Alexander was chosen as emperor of Bulgaria.

Ivan Stephen fled with his mother and his brother to Niš, in the lands of Belaur, where they stayed for a year and a half. In 1332 he and his mother moved to Dubrovnik while his brothers went to the Golden Horde, where his brother Shishman sought support from the Mongols and from the Byzantine Empire, but his efforts also came to nothing. There is no certain information on his later life.

According to Detlev Schwennicke Ivan Stephen went with his mother to southern Italy where he married the illegitimate daughter of Philip I, prince of Taranto, but did not have children. In 1342 he was with the future Byzantine emperor John VI Kantakouzenos during his escape from Constantinople. Twenty years later he was in a prison in Siena and seemed to have died in Naples in 1373. Schwennicke also wrote that Ivan Stephen could have perished in 1373 at a battle near Slobitza (modern name Slobozia).

References

Sources
 
 
 
Gregoras, Nicephorus. Byzantina historia
 
Schwennicke, Detlev Europäische Stammtafeln, Band II (1984)

External links
 Detailed List of the Bulgarian Rulers

14th-century deaths
14th-century Bulgarian emperors
Eastern Orthodox monarchs
Bulgarian people of the Byzantine–Bulgarian Wars
Shishman dynasty
Year of birth unknown
Bulgarian people of Serbian descent
Sons of emperors